Computer display technology encompasses:
 Computer monitor hardware technologies, such as CRT and LCD
 Audio and video interfaces and connectors